Kremlingames is an indie game development cooperative founded in 2014. They specialize in making geopolitical strategy games in which the player is given the opportunity to rewrite the history of the Soviet Union (USSR) and other countries. The studio is co-owned by Maxim Chornobuk and Vasiliy Kostylev, with other members contributing to important decisions.

Kremlingames has created several games including Crisis in the Kremlin (2017), Ostalgie: The Berlin Wall and China: Mao's Legacy, in which players control the Soviet Union, one of the many Eastern Bloc nations or several other socialist states, and the People's Republic of China (PRC), respectively.

Kremlingames is a bilingual developer, releasing games in both Russian and English. Their games tend to revolve around managing a country politically and economically during the Cold War. Their most recent game is titled Collapse: A Political Simulator.

Games

Crisis in the Kremlin (2017) 
Kremlingames' first game, Crisis in the Kremlin (Russian: Кризис в Кремле), is a remake of a game of the same title created in 1991. The player acts as the leader of the Soviet Union. The game primarily takes place during the Perestroika period of the USSR. Unlike the original, the goal is not just to preserve the USSR and the Warsaw Pact; the player is able to pursue a myriad of other victory conditions, including the expansion of the communist bloc. In this game, it is possible to win the Cold War by weakening the United States until it no longer is a superpower. The game introduced additional factions and multiple endings that include perestroika, nuclear war, world communism, and parades of sovereignty. The economic, domestic, and diplomatic systems were also made more complex.

Since its release, Crisis in the Kremlin has been updated regularly and has received downloadable content (DLC), including Homeland of the Revolution and The Accident.

Development and reception 
The game was developed on the Unity engine. By February 2016, a schematic system of internal politics permitted the establishment of doctrines and adoption of laws. Foreign policy is presented in the form of a detailed map of the world (Europe, Asia/Oceania, Africa, and both Americas) with buttons for interaction with countries, doctrines, and events, as well as indicators of relations with the United States and China. The game has the ability to reform the Soviet government, budget allocation, and detailed statistics. The game is turn-based: the player modifies policy, changes the budget, and moves on to the next month via an event.

The game was released on March 20, 2017.

It received overwhelmingly positive feedback on Steam (9/10) and has been noted by Game World Navigator as a good successor to the 1991 version, especially for its depth and attention to detail. However, it is not without its fair share of criticism, most notably over its perceived overall clunkiness and confusing user interface. The prominent Russian gaming magazine Game World Navigator gave the game a rating of 6.2/10, and criticized the game for its user interface,  Another prominent Russian gaming magazine, Igromania, rated the game 8/10, complimenting the game on its complex and detailed interactions but noted the graphics as "terrifying".

On August 22, 2017, The Accident DLC was released, which saw players take control of the Soviet Republic of Ukraine. Its storylines include the Chernobyl nuclear power plant accident and Gorbachev's implementation of Perestroika. On March 12, 2020, this was followed by the Homeland of the Revolution DLC, which saw players take control of the RSFSR in 1989–1991, following the political struggle between Mikhail Gorbachev and Boris Yeltsin and the parade of sovereignties.

Ostalgie: The Berlin Wall 
In the summer of 2017, with the unexpected success of Crisis in the Kremlin, Kremlingames began work on Ostalgie: The Berlin Wall. Like its predecessor, it follows the events of the Cold War and focuses on the nations of the Communist bloc in 1989–1990. Ostalgie: The Berlin Wall diverges from Crisis in the Kremlin in several ways. It operates in real-time with new functions to expand diplomacy and create buildings. The player can play as East Germany, Bulgaria, Poland, or Romania in the base game with each expansion adding more nations, each having its own unique struggles. It was released on March 25, 2018.

The object of the game is to stay in power until the end of 1992. During this time, players can either accelerate or prevent the collapse of the socialist camp. Players make decisions regarding strengthening their leftist regimes or reforming government. The game also allows players to help the conservatives in the PRC and the USSR to roll back or accelerate reforms.

Since its release, Ostalgie: The Berlin Wall has had several expansions including Legacy of Hoxha (adding Albania, Hungary, and Czechoslovakia) and Fall of the Curtain (adding North Korea, Cuba, and Afghanistan).

Ostalgie: The Berlin Wall and its expansions have received positive reviews from players on Steam (9/10). The game won 2nd place in the Fan Favorite category in the 2018 Game Development World Championship awards. The game was also reviewed favorably by the East German periodical Neues Deutschland.

China: Mao's Legacy 
China: Mao's Legacy is a political strategy game that follows the People's Republic of China from 1976 to 1985 in the turbulent period during and after the death of Mao Zedong. The game focuses on maintaining the country both economically and politically while preventing a non-peaceful transfer of power. Players are faced with numerous choices, such as whether to invade Vietnam, imprison the Gang of Four, integrate Hong Kong, interfere in various skirmishes, and restore relations with the USSR. All parameters of China can be controlled—its political system, economy, army, special services, family policies, doctrine of Freedoms, and much more.

The game features a new system of politicians, including actual Chinese politicians of that period as well as game-generated characters. The fate of these characters' careers is entirely under the player's control.

Development and reception 
China: Mao's Legacy began development in Spring 2018. It was developed using the engine of its predecessor (Unity) and used the economic functions of the DLC The Accident from Crisis in the Kremlin. The game was released on May 25, 2019.

The game received, in general, positive feedback from players on Steam (9/10) but was blocked in the PRC. The Hong Kong-based news organization Initium Media in its book Game On: 歡迎進入遊戲世界 regarded the subject matter sad and the game as difficult but also rewarding in allowing the player to change history.

Collapse: A Political Simulator 
Collapse: A Political Simulator is a political simulator and strategy game focused around managing a fictional former Soviet Republic—aptly named "Republic"—following the collapse of the USSR. The game allows you to take control as the leader of one of the major political parties of Republic and attempt to win offices in and control of the various regions of the country. The game takes place between the years of 1992 and 2004. Republic starts off in a dire situation and it is up to the player whether or not conditions improve in the country. The game was released on Feb 23, 2021.

Other games and projects

Euromaidan 
Euromaidan is a game dedicated to Euromaidan and Revolution of Dignity, released in 2015. The player could play as the legitimate President of Ukraine, Viktor Yanukovych, or contenders for his position during the Euromaidan demonstrations. The game is similar to Crisis in the Kremlin but also has the capacity for multiplayer.

The first version of the game, allegedly, in many ways brought some fame to the company, spreading "from hand to hand."

Kremlinocracy 
Kremlinocracy is a game released in 2015. Kremlinocracy plays similarly to the psychological verbal game Mafia. The player's goal is to seize power and maintain it for at least three years. There are three featured scenarios:

 The death of Lenin,
 The death of Brezhnev, and 
 Alternate reality Russia, where Medvedev continued Yeltsin's policy.

Empire: Paths of History 
Empire: Paths of History (Russian: Империя: Пути истории) is a text-based game with Soviet, German, and Perestroika campaigns and a script editor. In the game, the player takes the role of the head of a secret organization. The player has access to the statistics of the country and the opportunity to choose between candidates for the presidency, with the corresponding consequences—in the German campaign there is a choice between the Ost plan and the Ribbentrop plan, and in the campaign dedicated to Perestroika, reform options are offered.

The Collapse 
The game-novel Collapse was announced shortly after the release of Crisis in the Kremlin. The player would assume the role of a KGB officer in the midst of the events of 1991 who must investigate the death of an important officer of the state security agencies. Kremlingames suspended and then froze its development indefinitely to focus on Ostalgie. In September 2019, the project was terminated.

See also 
 Crisis in the Kremlin
 Hidden Agenda – another one of Kremlingames' main inspirations

References

External links 
 
 
 „Auf zum letzten Gefecht!“ Musikalische Repräsentation von Marxismus, Kommunismus und Revolution in Videospielen — A scholarly article featuring a review on the musicality of Kremlingames' Crisis in the Kremlin.

Indie video game developers
Video game companies established in 2014
Video game companies of Russia
Worker cooperatives